Stopp! Tänk på något annat is a 1944 Swedish drama film directed by Åke Ohberg.

Plot summary
Karsten falls in love with Sonja, she rejects him, but not because of lack of interest. She travels to France and he goes after her. They get to know each other and become close. When Karsten has to travel back home again he fails to persuade her to come along with him. When she finally returns he continues his courtship. Sonja does not trust Karsten, but she soon realizes that he has matured considerably and she decides to start a relationship with him.

Cast 
Eva Henning as Sonja Strömbeck 
Hasse Ekman as Karsten Kirsewetter 
Olof Winnerstrand as Wilhelm Kirsewetter, Karstens father
Hjördis Petterson as Henriette Kirsewetter, Karstens mother 
Ingrid Backlin as Annemari Tirén 
Anders Ek as Mårten Bergfelt 
Hugo Björne as Oscar Patrik Tirén, priest, Annemaries far 
Gösta Cederlund as Hans Strömbäck, Sonjas father 
Marianne Löfgren as Mrs. Strömbeck, Sonjas mother 
Marianne Gyllenhammar as Lisbeth 
Curt Masreliez as Hasse af Stråhlberg 
Nina Scenna as Hilma, Kirsewetters maid 
Magnus Kesster as Frans Kvist 
Constance Gibson as Lotten, Lisbeths grandmother

External links 
 

1944 films
1940s Swedish-language films
Swedish drama films
1944 drama films
Swedish black-and-white films
Films directed by Åke Ohberg
1940s Swedish films